Statistics of the 1974 Cameroonian Premier League season.

Overview
Canon Yaoundé won the championship.

References
Cameroon - List of final tables (RSSSF)

1974 in Cameroonian football
Cam
Cam
Elite One seasons